The Cerutti Mastodon site is a paleontological and possible archeological site located in San Diego County, California. In 2017, researchers announced that broken mastodon bones at the site had been dated to around 130,700 years ago.

The bones were found with cobblestones displaying use-wear and impact marks among the otherwise fine-grain sands. Researchers have proposed that these marks were caused by the intentional breakage of the broken bones by hominins using the cobblestones. If so, this suggestion would be older by far than the scientific consensus for habitation of the New World, which generally traces widespread human migration to the Americas to 13,000 to 16,000 years ago.

Context 
The Cerutti Mastodon site (SDNHM locality 3767) is a paleontological site located in San Diego County, California, United States. A team of researchers from the San Diego Natural History Museum, led by Thomas Deméré, excavated the site from 1992 to 1993. The site is named after Richard Cerutti, another paleontologist from the museum who is credited with discovering the site during freeway expansion of State Route 54. Prior to the construction for the expansion, this area consisted of a hilly ridge that was parallel to the new freeway. The site was found approximately nine feet down under sediments that were called “unnamed Pleistocene stream deposits”

The construction of this freeway was completed with the use of a Caterpillar 235C excavator which is a backhoe with a reach of 39.4 feet and a downward dig of 26.4 feet at ground level. The site was found after the construction of a drainage system needed to be done requiring a breach of the sound berm in order to gain access to the drainpipe, the construction of a catch basin at the northern slope of the sound berm and on the south slope the burial of a drainpipe. Materials were placed at the base of the sound berm towards the east after which the bones were found and hand excavation followed.

Findings 
The fossil remains of a juvenile male Mammut americanum (SDNHM 49926) were discovered in stratigraphic layer Bed E at the site: the recovered bones include 2 tusks, 3 molars, 4 vertebrae, 16 ribs, 2 phalanx bones, 2 sesamoids and over 300 other bone fragments. The remains of dire wolf, horse, camel, mammoth and ground sloth were also discovered at the site. Five cobbles displaying use-wear and impact marks were also recovered from the site in Bed E.

The research team found cobbles and broken mastodon bones lying together at the site. Uranium-thorium dating of bones from the site estimates a dating of around 130,700 (±9,400) years ago for the Cerutti Mastodon site. The research team claims that the cobbles found at the site were used as hammerstones and anvils. The research team also claims that the mastodon bones show signs of intentional breakage by hominins. If so, this would indicate that some form of Homo was present in the Americas at an extremely early age. 

Analysis from the research team states that the spiral fracturing of the different fragments suggests that the impact occurred when they were fresh and that there is also evidence of percussion. They also state that due to their distribution and occurrence this breakage most likely occurred at the site where they were buried. They suggest that the evidence shows that humans who had manual dexterity and experience with hammerstones and anvils extracted marrow from the mastodon limb bones or raw material to use for tool production.
The wear and impact marks on the five cobbles were also compared with features on hammerstones and anvils that had been used in bone breakage experiments to help determine if it was likely they were used in this way.

Criticism 
The dating of the peopling of the Americas is a very contentious subject. For most of the 20th Century, the Clovis First theory was dominant, dating human habitation of the Americas to no earlier than 13,000 years ago. Later data pushed back the date from Clovis First, with theories suggesting dates of approximately 15,000 to 24,000 years ago. Other theories proposed dates as early as 40,000 years ago.

Given the substantial differences between these theories and the Cerutti findings, some researchers responded with skepticism. Several critics have argued that the evidence from the site did not definitively rule out the possibility that the cobbles may have been altered due to natural causes. Other critics also cite the lack of lithic artifacts and debris, generally found at sites associated with lithic tool manufacturing, at the Cerutti Mastodon site. Archaeologists also cite the lack of taphonomic evidence at the site, evidence that is generally required to support claims of material culture.

No human bones were found, and the claims of tools and bone processing have been described as "not plausible". Michael R. Waters commented that "To demonstrate such early occupation of the Americas requires the presence of unequivocal stone artefacts. There are no unequivocal stone tools associated with the bones... this site is likely just an interesting paleontological locality." Chris Stringer said that  "extraordinary claims require extraordinary evidence - each aspect requires the strongest scrutiny," adding that "High and concentrated forces must have been required to smash the thickest mastodon bones, and the low energy depositional environment seemingly provides no obvious alternative to humans using the heavy cobbles found with the bones."

Another 2017 paper by eight anthropologists including Tom Dillehay, David J. Meltzer, Richard Klein, Vance T. Holliday and Jon M. Erlandson pointed out the ample supply of good stone for making tools in the area, saying that "the absence of clearly modified chipped stone tools at the CML is damning". They argued that nothing has yet been found to prove that there were hominins in the Americas before ~50 kya.

The claim that the stone tools were created by a human was also challenged by a former CalTrans land surveyor, who suggested that the site was affected by heavy earth moving construction. Ferrell believes that “the raking of the steel teeth on the excavator bucket across the site dragged the cobbles identified as anvils and hammer stones onto the site from the north, and could also account for the fragmentation of some of those cobbles, and the molar which was broken into three parts”. Furthermore, he states that the impact of the dump trucks would have had “compressive and distorting effects on the sediments and materials enclosed in them”  It has further been argued that the man-made fractures on the remains themselves were a result of the construction.

Thomas Deméré however in response to critiques states that many of the critics have not examined the bones themselves and that their critique is based on "long-distance interpretations of our data" and that other hypothesis do not take into account of all of the evidence found.

Another issue surrounding the findings concluded in the 2017 Nature article and its critics according to Fisher, one of the authors on this paper is that the critics want indisputable proof that human agency was involved in these modifications which he states is an "unrealistic standard".

Followup study 
A 2020 paper by Luc Bordes, Elspeth Hayes, Richard Fullager and Tom Deméré, supported the suggestion made in the original study that the cobbles were intentionally used by hominins to break the mastodon bones. This new data has identified bone micro-residues on cobbles pegmatite CM-254 and andesite CM-281. The micro residues were only found on the upward facing surface of the cobbles whilst there was no residue found on the downward facing surfaces. The surfaces of the cobbles that showed no wear also had no traces of micro residue showing that the bones were only in contact with some surfaces of the cobbles. The authors claimed that this meant that the contact had to be forceful enough to transfer residue, whereas residue would completely coat the cobbles had the transfer been as a result of environmental exposure. They state that the bone residue and the damaged surface of the cobbles occur under a carbonate crust that develops over time and therefore, this leads them to believe that the bone residue was transferred to the cobbles when the site was formed around 130,700 years ago. The authors concluded that these cobbles served as hammers and anvils in order to break the bones which is consistent with the original findings.  Other authors still expressed skepticism, continuing to contend that the supposed anthropogenic nature of the site was actually the result of road construction.

See also 
 Bluefish Caves
 Calico Early Man Site
 Pedra Furada
 Hueyatlaco
 Settlement of the Americas

References

Citations

Bibliography

External links 
 Cerutti Mastodon site – San Diego Natural History Museum
 
 3D Models of Specimens – University of Michigan Online Repository of Fossils

Paleontology in California
Pleistocene paleontological sites of North America
Pre-Clovis archaeological sites in the Americas